Grounds for Divorce is a 1925 American silent romantic comedy film directed by Paul Bern and written by Guy Bolton, Violet Clark, and Ernest Vajda. The film stars Florence Vidor, Matt Moore, Harry Myers, Louise Fazenda, George Beranger and Gustav von Seyffertitz. The film was released on July 27, 1925, by Paramount Pictures.

Plot
Maurice Sorbier, one of the best known divorce lawyers in Paris, himself ends up divorcing his wife Alice. This remarries with the count Zappata, to the great disappointment of one of her suitor, Guido, aviator and well-known heartthrob. Alice soon realizes she doesn't love the count, but he refuses to give her a divorce. At Guido's suggestion, the lady turns to her ex-husband to ask him for advice but, above all, to have an excuse to see him again. Guido convinces the count to get on the plane with him and, once in flight, he terrifies him with a series of dangerous stunts to get him to sign a document that grants a divorce to Alice. Finally on the ground, Guido discovers disappointed that the woman has run away with Maurice. The aviator is left with nothing but the comfort of Marianne, an admirer who has been tormenting him for some time.

Cast

Preservation
The film survives in the Library of Congress collection incomplete as it is missing reel 3.

References

External links 
 
 

1925 films
1920s English-language films
Silent American comedy films
1925 comedy films
Paramount Pictures films
American black-and-white films
American silent feature films
1920s American films